Kishma is a river in Nizhny Novgorod Oblast in Russia and a right tributary of the Oka.

References

Rivers of Nizhny Novgorod Oblast